The second season of the Brazilian competitive reality television series MasterChef premiered on May 19, 2015 at 10:30 p.m. on Band.

Event producer Izabel Alvares won the competition over publicist Raul Lemos on September 15, 2015.

Contestants

Top 18

Elimination table

Key

Ratings and reception

Brazilian ratings
All numbers are in points and provided by IBOPE.

References

External links
 MasterChef on Band.com
 

2015 Brazilian television seasons
MasterChef (Brazilian TV series)